Beak (stylized as BEAK>) is an English experimental electronic rock music band, consisting of Geoff Barrow (of Portishead), together with Billy Fuller (Robert Plant's Sensational Space Shifters) and Will Young (Moon Gangs), who replaced Matt Williams (MXLX, Fairhorns) in 2016.

History 
Beak released its self-titled debut album on 16 November 2009. The music was recorded live in one room with no overdubs or repair, only using edits to create arrangements. All tracks were written over a twelve-day session in Bristol, England.

Beak produced the debut album Anika by Anika and co-wrote two of the album's songs in 2010.

In 2010, the band toured in the US and the UK.  It was chosen by Portishead to perform at the ATP I'll Be Your Mirror festival, that Portishead curated in July 2011 at London's Alexandra Palace, as well as the US version of ATP's I'll Be Your Mirror in Asbury Park, New Jersey.

Beak did the soundtrack for Tom Geens' 2015 film Couple in a Hole, drawing largely on the band's earlier material.

Discography
 BEAK> (Ipecac Records, Invada, Temporary Residence 2009)
 >> (Invada Records, 2012)
 Couple in a Hole (2016)
>>> (Temporary Residence, 2018)

Compilations 
L.A. Playback (2018) – a selection of songs from various Beak releases 2012-2015

References

English rock music groups
English electronic music groups
English experimental rock groups
Musical groups from Bristol
Musical groups established in 2009
British musical trios
Trip hop groups
Portishead (band)
Ipecac Recordings artists
Temporary Residence Limited artists